The United Kingdom competed under the name Great Britain and Northern Ireland. The nation was represented by 72 athletes at the 2010 European Athletics Championships held in Barcelona, Spain.

With a squad of 72 athletes, Great Britain and Northern Ireland sent the fifth largest national team of the competition. The nation won a record 19 medals over the course of the six-day championships, beating their previous greatest medal haul of 18 from the 1990 European Athletics Championships. Head coach Charles van Commenee praised a number of athletes, saying that the team performance was good in terms of building towards the 2012 London Olympics. A number of high-profile athletes were missing from the squad due to injuries, including three 2008 Olympic medallists (Christine Ohuruogu, Tasha Danvers, and Germaine Mason), as well as women's marathon runners Paula Radcliffe and Mara Yamauchi.

Both the men's and women's 4 x 100 m relay teams had difficulties with baton changeovers, resulting in poor performances in an event that the country is typically strong: the women's team was sixth in their heat while the men missed the final by finishing in fifth place.

Participants

Results

Men
Track and road events

Field events

Women
Track and road events

Field events

References 

 Participants list

Nations at the 2010 European Athletics Championships
2010
European Athletics Championships